Virginie Gloum (born 8 June 1968) is a Central African Republic long distance runner. She competed in the women's 10000 metres at the 1996 Summer Olympics. She also ran unofficially in the Women's marathon after an incorrect qualifying time on her entry sheet. Gloum remains the Central African Republic female record holder for both 10000m and marathon times.

References

External links
 

1972 births
Living people
Athletes (track and field) at the 1996 Summer Olympics
Olympic athletes of the Central African Republic
World Athletics Championships athletes for the Central African Republic